Hao Jingfang (born 27 July 1984) is a Chinese science fiction writer. She won the Hugo Award for Best Novelette for Folding Beijing, translated by Ken Liu, at the 2016 Hugo Awards.

Biography
Hao Jingfang was born in Tianjin, on July 27, 1984. After high school, she studied, then worked, at Tsinghua University, in the area of physics. After noticing the economic inequality of China, she studied economics in Tsinghua University, obtained a doctoral degree in 2013, and worked as a researcher at China Development Research Foundation since then.

In 2002, as a high school student, she won the first prize at the 4th national high school "New Concept" writing competition. In 2016, she won the Hugo Award for Best Novelette for her work Folding Beijing. She became the first Chinese woman to win a Hugo Award.

Vagabonds was shortlisted for the 2021 Arthur C. Clarke Award.

Personal life
Hao is married and has a daughter.

Original Works

Short Stories 

 The Last Brave Man (最后一个勇敢的人)
 Invisible Planets (看不见的星球) 2013 (Lightspeed Magazine)
 The New Year Train (过年回家)

Novella 

 Folding Beijing (北京折叠) 2015 (Uncanny Magazine)

Novel 

 Vagabonds (流浪苍穹). Head of Zeus. 2020 .

References

External links

Living people
Chinese science fiction writers
21st-century Chinese novelists
Chinese women novelists
Hugo Award-winning writers
Yaohua High School alumni
Tsinghua University alumni
21st-century Chinese women writers
Writers from Tianjin
1984 births